is a Japanese documentary made in 1975 by Noriaki Tsuchimoto. It is the fourth in a series of independent documentaries that Tsuchimoto made of the mercury poisoning incident in Minamata, Japan.

Film content
Four years after Minamata: The Victims and Their World, Tsuchimoto's camera focuses on the everyday lives of the victims of mercury poisoning. Fisherman still knowingly catch and eat the mercury-laden fish caught in the beautiful Shiranui Sea because that is what they have always done and that is how they relate to nature. Some patients who received significant compensation from Chisso, the polluter, may now live in good houses, but without doing work their lives seem somehow empty. The real victims remain the children, who are now getting older and in some cases increasingly conscious of the fact they are different from other children.

Reception
The film scholar Justin Jesty wrote that The Shiranui Sea is "the crowning achievement of Tsuchimoto's first five years of engagement with mercury poisoning. The film is a long and powerful meditation on the depth and breadth of the tragedy." The documentarist Makoto Satō called The Shiranui Sea "the ultimate masterpiece" of Tsuchimoto's Minamata films; and the filmmaker John Gianvito selected it as one of the ten best films of all time in the 2012 Sight and Sound poll.

References

External links
 

1975 films
1975 in the environment
1975 documentary films
Documentary films about environmental issues
Documentary films about health care
Japanese documentary films
1970s Japanese-language films
1970s political films
Mercury poisoning
Films directed by Noriaki Tsuchimoto
1970s Japanese films